Lycodon is a genus of colubrid snakes, commonly known as wolf snakes. The New Latin name Lycodon is derived from the Greek words λύκος (lykos) meaning wolf and οδόν (odon) meaning tooth, and refers to the fang-like anterior maxillary and mandibular teeth. They are nonvenomous, but many members of this genus strongly resemble the venomous kraits in appearance, an example of Batesian mimicry.

Species
The genus Lycodon comprises 73 recognized species.

Lycodon albofuscus  
Lycodon alcalai  
Lycodon anakradaya 
Lycodon anamallensis 
Lycodon aulicus  
Lycodon banksi Luu et al., 2018
Lycodon bibonius  
Lycodon butleri  
Lycodon capucinus  
Lycodon cardamomensis  
Lycodon carinatus 
Lycodon cathaya 
Lycodon cavernicolus 
Lycodon chapaensis (Angel & Bourret, 1933)
Lycodon chithrasekarai Wickramasinghe et al., 2020
Lycodon chrysoprateros  
Lycodon davidi 
Lycodon davisonii 
Lycodon deccanensis  
Lycodon dumerili  
Lycodon effraenis  
Lycodon fasciatus  
Lycodon fasciolatus  
Lycodon fausti  
Lycodon ferroni  
Lycodon flavicollis  
Lycodon flavomaculatus  
Lycodon flavozonatus 
Lycodon futsingensis  
Lycodon gammiei 
Lycodon gibsonae  
Lycodon gongshan  
Lycodon gracilis  
Lycodon hypsirhinoides 
Lycodon jara  
Lycodon kundui  
Lycodon laoensis  
Lycodon liuchengchaoi 
Lycodon mackinnoni  
Lycodon meridionale 
Lycodon muelleri  
Lycodon multifasciatus 
Lycodon multizonatus 
Lycodon nympha 
Lycodon obvelatus 
Lycodon ophiophagus 
Lycodon orientalis 
Lycodon paucifasciatus 
Lycodon philippinus 
Lycodon pictus 
Lycodon rosozonatus 
Lycodon rufozonatus 
Lycodon ruhstrati 
Lycodon sealei 
Lycodon semicarinatus 
Lycodon septentrionalis 
Lycodon serratus 
Lycodon sidiki 
Lycodon solivagus 
Lycodon stormi 
Lycodon striatus 
Lycodon subannulatus 
Lycodon subcinctus 
Lycodon synaptor 
Lycodon tessellatus 
Lycodon tiwarii 
Lycodon travancoricus 
Lycodon tristrigatus 
Lycodon truongi 
Lycodon zawi 
Lycodon zayuensis 
Lycodon zoosvictoriae 

Nota bene: A binomial authority in parentheses indicates that the species was originally described in a genus other than Lycodon.

References

 
Colubrids
Snake genera
Taxa named by Leopold Fitzinger